USS Newton may refer to the following ships operated by the United States Navy:

, was launched in 1901; acquired by the US Navy in 1918 and used as a troop transport until 1919
, was acquired by the US Navy in 1922, redesignated IX-33 in 1941 and sold in September 1946

United States Navy ship names